James Lindsay, 24th Earl of Crawford and 7th Earl of Balcarres (24 April 1783 – 15 December 1869) was an Earl in the Peerage of Scotland.

Biography
James Lindsay was born on 24 April 1783 at Balcarres House in Fife, the son of Alexander Lindsay, 6th Earl of Balcarres and inherited the title of 7th Earl of Balcarres on his father's death in 1825. In 1826 he was created Baron of Wigan in the Peerage of Great Britain. In 1843 he claimed the abeyant title of Earl of Crawford and in 1848 the House of Lords allowed the claim and conferred on him the title of 24th Earl of Crawford, and by extension, the title of 23rd Earl of Crawford on his dead father.

He entered the army and attained the rank of major in the 20th Light Dragoons until he left in 1804. He was returned as Tory MP for Wigan from 1820 to 1825.

He inherited a third share of a company that supplied slaves to the British Army from his father (a former Governor of Jamaica). According to the Legacies of British Slave-Ownership at the University College London, Cleveland was awarded compensation in the aftermath of the Slavery Abolition Act 1833 with the Slave Compensation Act 1837. 

He designed Haigh Hall in Haigh, Greater Manchester, to replace the then-existing hall which dated back to Norman times and lived in a cottage in the grounds whilst it was constructed between 1830 and 1849. The family owned Haigh Colliery, cannel and coal mines, and formed the Wigan Coal and Iron Company in 1865.

After his death on 23 December 1869 he was buried at All Saints' Church, Wigan, Lancashire, and succeeded by his eldest son, Alexander Lindsay, 25th Earl of Crawford.

Marriage and children
On 21 November 1811 at Muncaster in Cumberland (now Cumbria), Crawford married the Hon Maria Margaret Frances Pennington, daughter of John Pennington, 1st Baron Muncaster. They had four sons:

 Alexander William Crawford Lindsay, 25th Earl of Crawford (16 October 1812 - 13 December 1880)
 Lt Gen Hon Sir James Lindsay (25 August 1815 - 13 August 1874)
 Colonel Hon Charles Hugh Lindsay (11 November 1816 - 25 March 1889)
 Hon Colin Lindsay (6 December 1819 - 28 January 1892)

Eldest son Alexander's genealogical research had enabled his father to claim the title of Earl of Crawford which had fallen into abeyance.

References

 
 
 Balcarres Family

Further reading
.
.

External links 
 

1783 births
1869 deaths
24
Earls of Balcarres
Tory MPs (pre-1834)
UK MPs 1820–1826
Crawford 24
UK MPs who were granted peerages
Members of the Parliament of the United Kingdom for Wigan
James
Scottish slave owners
Recipients of payments from the Slavery Abolition Act 1833
Peers of the United Kingdom created by George IV
Chetham Society